This list of museums in West Virginia encompasses museums defined for this context as institutions (including nonprofit organizations, government entities, and private businesses) that collect and care for objects of cultural, artistic, scientific, or historical interest and make their collections or related exhibits available for public viewing. Museums that exist only in cyberspace (i.e., virtual museums) are not included.

Museums

Defunct museums
 Buddy's Country Store & Museum, Bluewell, historic coal camp company store, closed in 2014 and contents auctioned
 Grafton B & O Railroad Heritage Center, Grafton 
 Marx Toy Museum, Moundsville, closed in 2016

Regions defined

The West Virginia Association of Museums has defined the following tourism regions of West Virginia:

Eastern Panhandle
Counties: Berkeley, Jefferson, Morgan

Potomac Highlands
Counties:  Grant, Hampshire, Hardy, Mineral, Pendleton, Pocahontas, Randolph, Tucker

North-Central West Virginia
Counties: Barbour, Doddridge, Harrison, Marion, Monongalia, Preston, Taylor

Northern Panhandle
Region includes Wheeling and Moundsville.  Counties: Brooke, Hancock, Marshall, Ohio, Tyler, Wetzel

Mountain Lakes
Counties: Braxton, Clay, Gilmer, Lewis, Nicholas, Upshur, Webster

Metro Valley
Region centered on Charleston and Huntington. Counties: Boone, Cabell, Kanawha, Lincoln, Logan, Mason, Mingo, Putnam, Wayne

Mid-Ohio Valley
Counties: Calhoun, Jackson, Pleasants, Ritchie, Roane, Wirt, Wood

New River/Greenbrier River Valleys
Includes most counties in Southern West Virginia.  Counties: Fayette, Greenbrier, Mercer, Monroe, Raleigh, Summers, Wyoming

See also
 Botanical gardens in West Virginia (category)
 Observatories in West Virginia (category)
Nature Centers in West Virginia
List of museums in the United States

References

External links
West Virginia Association of Museums
Historical Museum of WV

Museums
West Virginia
Museums